Edward Gleason Spaulding (6 August 1873 – 31 January 1940) was an American philosopher from Burlington, Vermont. He is a proponent of New Realism and co-wrote The New Realism.

Works
 The New Rationalism. The development of a constructive realism upon the basis of modern logic and science, and through criticism of opposed systems. New York: Henry Holt 1918
 A World of Chance. New York: Macmillan 1936

References

External links

 Holt, Edwin B; Marvin, Walter T; Montague, William P; Perry, Ralph B; Pitkin, Walter B; Edward Gleason Spaulding|Spaulding, Edward G. The New Realism: Cooperative Studies in Philosophy, (1912). New York: The Macmillan Company

1873 births
1940 deaths
American philosophers
Writers from Burlington, Vermont